Clawthorpe is a hamlet in the South Lakeland district, in the county of Cumbria, England. It is near the village of Burton-in-Kendal and the town of Kendal. Clawthorpe is on the A6070 road and nearly on the M6 motorway, but there is no access to Clawthorpe from the motorway.

References 

Hamlets in Cumbria
Burton-in-Kendal